LMS Stanier 2-6-4T may refer to two related types of steam locomotive:

 LMS 2-Cylindered Stanier 2-6-4T (Nos. (4) 2425-94 and (4) 2537-672)
 LMS 3-Cylindered Stanier 2-6-4T (Nos. (4) 2500-36)